The Mark of Cain is a 1917 American silent mystery film directed by George Fitzmaurice and starring Antonio Moreno, Irene Castle and J.H. Gilmour.

It was shot at studios in Fort Lee in New Jersey. The film's sets were designed by the art director William Cameron Menzies.

Cast
 Antonio Moreno as Kane Langdon 
 Irene Castle as Alice
 J.H. Gilmour as Trowbridge 
 Eleanor Black as Housekeeper 
 John St. Polis as Judge Hoyt

References

Bibliography
 Koszarski, Richard . Fort Lee: The Film Town (1904-2004). Indiana University Press, 2005.

External links
 

1917 films
1917 mystery films
American silent feature films
American mystery films
American black-and-white films
Films directed by George Fitzmaurice
Pathé Exchange films
1910s English-language films
1910s American films
Silent mystery films